The Two Aequali, WAB 114 & WAB 149, were composed by Anton Bruckner in 1847.

History 
Bruckner composed the two Aequali in end January 1847 during his stay in St. Florian Abbey. He composed them for the funeral of his aunt Rosalia Mayrhofer (1770–1847).

The manuscript of the first Aequale (WAB 114) is stored in the archive of the Seitenstetten Abbey. The work was first published in band II/2, p. 83 of the Göllerich/Auer biography.

The sketch of the second Aequale was retrieved later in the archive of the St. Florian Abbey. In the sketch the part of the bass trombone is missing. It was then put as addendum (WAB 149) to the already issued WAB classification.

Music 
The two Aequali in C minor, with 34 and 27 bars, respectively, are score for alto, tenor and bass trombones. In the edition of the  the missing part of the bass trombone of the second Aequale has been completed by Hans Bauernfeind.

The works are choral-sized with in WAB 114 a typical folklike melody in sixths. Similar musical sets were later used in the so-called  in Bruckner's later symphonies.

Selected discography 

Bruckner's two Aequali are popular pieces for trombone ensembles and are also often put as additional pieces to recordings of choral works. 

The first recording occurred in 1970:
 Members of the Berliner Posaunenquartett, Trombone Equale – LP: CBS SOCL 285 (only Aequale No. 1)

A selection among the about 50 recordings:
 Matthew Best, Corydon Singers, English Chamber Orchestra Wind Ensemble, Mass in E minor; Libera me; Zwei Aequale – CD: Hyperion CDA66177, 1986
 Philippe Herreweghe, la Chapelle Royale/Collegium Vocale, Ensemble Musique Oblique, Bruckner: Messe en mi mineur; Motets – CD: Harmonia Mundi France HMC 901322, 1989
 Simon Halsey, CBSO Wind Ensemble & Chorus, Mass in E minor (No. 2) / Motets – CD: Conifer CDCF 192, 1990
 Robert Shewan, Roberts Wesleyan College Chorale & Brass Ensemble, Choral Works of Anton Bruckner – CD: Albany TROY 063, 1991
 Triton Posaunenquartett, German Music for Trombones – CD: Bis 500644, 1993
 Jonathan Brown, Ealing Abbey Choir,  Anton Bruckner: Sacred Motets – CD: Herald HAVPCD 213, 1997
 Hans-Christoph Rademann, NDR Chor Hamburg, Anton Bruckner: Ave Maria – CD: Carus 83.151, 2000
 Erwin Ortner, Arnold Schoenberg Chor, Anton Bruckner: Tantum ergo – CD: ASC Edition 3, issue of the choir, 2008
 Wiener Posaunenquartett, Bach & Bruckner - CD: Schagerl Records, 2009
 Duncan Ferguson, Choir of St. Mary's Cathedral of Edinburgh, Bruckner: Motets  – CD: Delphian Records DCD34071, 2010
 Nigel Short, Tenebrae, Brahms & Bruckner Motets – CD: Signums Classics SIGCD430, 2015
Some recordings use completions of the score of the bass trombone of the second Aequale, that are not based on that by Hans Bauernfeind. According to Hans Roelofs, the best recording is that by Halsey. Other excellent recordings are those by Best, Herreweghe, Ortner, Rademann and Short.

See also 
 Aequale
 Drei Equale für vier Posaunen, by Beethoven

References

Sources 
 Uwe Harten, Anton Bruckner. Ein Handbuch. , Salzburg, 1996. .
 August Göllerich, Anton Bruckner. Ein Lebens- und Schaffens-Bild,  – posthumous edited by Max Auer by G. Bosse, Regensburg, 1932
 Anton Bruckner – Sämtliche Werke, Band XXI: Kleine Kirchenmusikwerke, Musikwissenschaftlicher Verlag der Internationalen Bruckner-Gesellschaft, Hans Bauernfeind and Leopold Nowak (Editor), Vienna, 1984/2001
 Cornelis van Zwol, Anton Bruckner 1824–1896 – Leven en werken, uitg. Thoth, Bussum, Netherlands, 2012.

External links 
 
 
 Zwei Aequale c-Moll für 3 Posaunen Critical discography by Hans Roelofs 
 Live performances can be heard on YouTube:
 Collegium Musicum of Munich (6 February 2011): Aequale I, WAB 114 and Aequale II, WAB 149
 Chamber Music on the Fox (26 February 2018): Aequale I, WAB 114 and Aequale II, WAB 149
 Recordings in the Sankt Florian Abbey: Aequale No. 1, Aequale No. 2 - Bass trombone score of Aequale No. 2 reconstructed by James Justin Kent
 Recordings by members of the trombone section of the Royal Concertgebouw Orchestra: Aequale No. 1, Aequale No. 2 - Aequale No. 1 using the Göllerich's score; bass trombone score of Aequale No. 2 by unknown author

1847 compositions
Motets by Anton Bruckner
Compositions in C minor
Compositions for trombone